Southbrook is a suburb of Rangiora, in North Canterbury, New Zealand. It is located at the south end of the town. The population in the 2013 Census was 801. As the term "town" has no official meaning in New Zealand, Southbrook is sometimes considered as a separate town.

Demographics

Southbrook had a population of 771 at the 2018 New Zealand census, a decrease of 27 people (-3.4%) since the 2013 census, and an increase of 33 people (4.5%) since the 2006 census. There were 276 households. There were 381 males and 393 females, giving a sex ratio of 0.97 males per female. The median age was 37.5 years (compared with 37.4 years nationally), with 156 people (20.2%) aged under 15 years, 174 (22.6%) aged 15 to 29, 300 (38.9%) aged 30 to 64, and 144 (18.7%) aged 65 or older.

Ethnicities were 93.4% European/Pākehā, 8.2% Māori, 2.3% Pacific peoples, 3.5% Asian, and 2.3% other ethnicities (totals add to more than 100% since people could identify with multiple ethnicities).

The proportion of people born overseas was 17.5%, compared with 27.1% nationally.

Although some people objected to giving their religion, 54.1% had no religion, 36.6% were Christian, 0.4% were Muslim, 0.8% were Buddhist and 1.9% had other religions.

Of those at least 15 years old, 63 (10.2%) people had a bachelor or higher degree, and 117 (19.0%) people had no formal qualifications. The median income was $32,200, compared with $31,800 nationally. The employment status of those at least 15 was that 306 (49.8%) people were employed full-time, 87 (14.1%) were part-time, and 21 (3.4%) were unemployed.

Education
Southbrook has one primary school and one state-integrated area school.

 Southbrook School is a state co-educational full primary school with a roll of  students (as of  The school opened in 1874.
 Rangiora New Life School is a state-integrated co-educational full primary school.

References

Rangiora
Populated places in Canterbury, New Zealand